The twelfth season of Deutschland sucht den Superstar was broadcast on German channel RTL from 17 January to 16 May 2015. It was won by Severino Seeger.

History 
During the live shows of the previous season, it was announced that the castings for season 12 would start in August 2014. RTL's Head of Program Frank Hoffmann stated that he wants to keep the series for the years the come, although the ratings continued to fall, especially in the live shows. He further explained that the live shows would be cut to an "absolute minimum". In late 2014, RTL gave closer details to the changes of season 12. The live shows are replaced with pre-recorded concerts in clubs in Germany, Austria, and Switzerland. Only the announcement of the results will be broadcast live. In contrary to the seasons before, the final will not take place in a TV studio in Cologne, but in the ÖVB Arena in Bremen.

For the first time, auditions will be held in the Czech Republic, Poland, the Netherlands, Luxembourg, and Belgium. In October 2014, RTL announced that Marianne Rosenberg, Mietze Katz, and Kay One wouldn't return for the twelfth season. The new jury consists of Dieter Bohlen, Swiss disc jockey DJ Antoine, Schlager singer Heino and singer Mandy Capristo.

The winner of the Deutschland sucht den Superstar 2015 was announced as Severino Seeger, with Viviana Grisafi finishing as the runner-up. The winner song, "Hero of My Heart", was produced and written by juror Dieter Bohlen.

Auditions and "Recall" 

the start of the season was on Wednesday, 7 January 2015. In addition to longtime juror Dieter Bohlen, Popstars winner Mandy Capristo, DJ Antoine, and pop singer Heino were part of the jury. In the casting rounds, each candidate selected before the show from a  Golden CD  with the name of the juror, whose voice should be the deciding factor for advancement or leaving a draw jury voting. Menderes reached the fourth time the "Recall". There is a "Quick Pick" was held where each candidate had to sing again. RTL did not broadcast this Germany-Recall. Instead, only a short scene was shown in which piles announced that the 34 pre-worn Recall of the 110 candidates in Thailand recall were.

"Re-recall"
The Recall in Thailand was reached by 16 women and 18 men. The contestants were separated into three to four groups by each gender for the first four performances. The theme for the first performances on the highest building in Bangkok was Black and White. After that performance, the judges sent four contestants home. For the next challenge, which should be with a spectacular intro in the middle of a street in front of local inhabitants, they sang again in groups, with three of them leaving the competition after it. The third appearance in a historic temple district on the outskirts of Bangkok acknowledged the jury with seven return tickets and the advancement of 19 candidates. They had to go for the obligatory beach appearance on the island of Ko Hong Ko Hong archipelago in the south of the country. The location near Phuket, belonging to a national park island, formed a picturesque backdrop for the resignation of five other superstar aspirants. The remaining 14 candidates sang seven same-sex or mixed-duets on a covered swimming pool with Plexiglas.

The eliminated acts of the Re-recall were:

Finalists

Event-Shows
The Event shows are held from 25 April to 16 May 2015 with three pre-recorded shows and a live final. The voting results were published right after the final.

Color key

Top 10 - Ischgl - "Top of the Mountain"
The first event show was held in Ischgl and was pre-recorded on 11 April 2015. The live result show in Cologne was aired directly after the event show. The two contestants with the fewest votes were eliminated. 
Original airdate: 25 April 2015

Group performance: "Auf uns" - Andreas Bourani
Guest performance: Andreas Gabalier

Top 8 - Balver Höhle – "The Dome Of Stone"
The first event show will be held in the Balver Höhle and will be pre-recorded on 29 April 2015. The live result show in Cologne was aired directly after the event show. The two contestants with the fewest votes were eliminated.
Original airdate: 2 May 2015

Group performance: "Love Runs Out"

Top 6 - Leipzig - "Semi-final"
The semi-final will be held in Leipzig at the Leipzig Trade Fair glass hall and was pre-recorded on 5 May 2015. The live result show in Cologne was aired directly after the event show. Only the three contestants with the most votes advanced to the final, and the other three were eliminated.
Original airdate: 9 May 2015

Group performance: "Blame"

Top 3 - Bremen – "The Final"
Original airdate: 16 May 2015
The Final was held in Bremen at the ÖVB Arena in front of 11,000 people. One Contestant was eliminated after the first performance. The other two performed their favorite performance and the winner's single.
Group performances: "Auf uns" - Andreas Bourani (by the eliminated contestants of the Top 10), "Don't Worry" (by the Top 3)
Guest performer: Söhne Mannheims - "Geh davon aus"

Round 1

Round 2

 Antonio Gerardi would have performed "Caruso" and "Hero of My Heart".

Elimination chart

References

External links 
 Official website

Season 11
2015 in German music
2015 German television seasons